Taboo is a 1980 American pornographic film starring Kay Parker. It was written and produced by Helene Terrie and edited and directed by Kirdy Stevens. The film is the first of a series of 23 episodes to date (from 1980 to 2007).

Cast
 Kay Parker as Barbara Scott
 Dorothy LeMay as Sherry
 Mike Ranger as Paul Scott
 Miko Yani as Girl with Gina
 Juliet Anderson as Gina
 Tawny Pearl as Diane
 Lee LeMay as Charlie
 Turk Lyon as Chris Scott
 Milton Ingley as Jerry Morgan (as Michael Morrison)
 Holly McCall as Marlene

Plot 
The story of this film starts with the difficulties of a woman's life after the abandonment of her husband. The Scott family's wife, Barbara (Kay Parker), decides to face life after being abandoned by her husband Chris and the father of her son Paul (Mike Ranger), beginning to look for work without much fortune. Seeing her sad and without company, her friend Gina (Juliet Anderson) gets her a date with a friend, who takes her to a swingers party.

On the other hand, her son Paul with his girlfriend Sherry (Dorothy LeMay) shows a sex addiction and on the eve of his mother's date, Paul begins to have incestuous desires after seeing his mother naked.

Barbara's date was a failure, however the images provoked in her an unthinkable lust for her own son Paul. Regretful and not knowing what to do, Barbara takes refuge affectionately in an old friend, Jerry, who in addition to company and affection gave her a job.

The story shows that Barbara achieved her work and emotional goals, without completely closing her chapter of passion between Paul and her.

Reception 
In 1983, the film won an Homer Award from the prestigious Video Software Dealers Association in the category of Best Adult Tape (an inaugural award for X-rated films). The recognition was considered by many as a turning point in the acceptance of adult entertainment by the mainstream video industry. At  Website Adams Underground praised Kay Parker's performance ("(Parker)...envelops the role of Barbara with a gentle, sensuous mist of sophisticated feminine allure that tantalizes with tangible passion stirring deep within that magnificent bosom") and the movie's visuals. But criticized the unrealistic portrayal of incest, the movie's ending and several technical aspects of the film, including the editing and the sound. Concluding: "In closing, all of Taboo's flaws amount to nothing more than a quickly forgotten boo-boo that Barbara sweetly kisses away with a warm tenderness that leaves you with indelible, pleasant memories." Roger Feelbert from Pornonomy gave the film a B+ rating, stating: "Overall, Taboo was well paced and acted and while I personally think it could have benefited from a slightly darker tone (something akin to 3 AM), as its own entity it's befitting of the place it holds in porn history." Roger T. Pipe from Rogreviews gave the film 11 out of 12 stars and said about "Taboo": "I don't think anyone is going to pick this up expecting a modern raincoater flick. If you were looking for that, please look elsewhere. The sex scenes are short, softer than we are used to and simply not up to the best of what we get these days. That's the down side of course. On the bright side, we get to see a classic.".

Steve Pulaski from Steve The Movie Man called the film a "landmark in porn...that could very well be considered an early American, feature-length porn film focusing on a fetish, in this case, mother/son incest". He also noted that "Taboo" was written by a woman and in its core, the film is about how women are treated in our society: "The film, at its core, shows how a woman is rejected from everything, society, employers, and even her husband for allegedly not being good enough, and the first time she finally does something she wants, she's overcome with guilt and shame. Who would've thought a pornographic film would ever go this deep (metaphorically speaking)?"

See also
 Golden Age of Porn

References

External links
 

1980 films
1980s pornographic films
American pornographic films
Incest pornography
MILF pornography
Incest in film
1980s English-language films
1980s American films